Peter Beale is a character from EastEnders from 1993 onwards.

Peter Beale may also refer to:
Pete Beale, character from EastEnders from 1985 to 1993
Peter Beale (British Army officer) (born 1934), Surgeon General of the British Armed Forces, 1991–1994